Microbacterium foliorum is a bacterium from the genus Microbacterium which has been isolated from the phyllosphere of grasses in Germany.

References

Further reading

External links
Type strain of Microbacterium foliorum at BacDive -  the Bacterial Diversity Metadatabase	

Bacteria described in 2001
foliorum